McKenzie Wark (born 1961) is an Australian-born writer and scholar. Wark is known for her writings on media theory, critical theory, new media, and the Situationist International.  Her best known works are A Hacker Manifesto and Gamer Theory. She is Professor of Media and Cultural Studies at The New School in New York City.

Life
Wark was born in Newcastle, Australia in 1961 and grew up with her older brother Robert and sister Susan. When McKenzie was 6 years old, her mother died. Brother Robert McKenzie Wark remembers reading to McKenzie as a young child and the three children were brought up by their architect father Ross Kenneth Wark. McKenzie received a bachelor's degree from Macquarie University, a Master's from the University of Technology, Sydney and received a PhD in communications from Murdoch University. Wark was married to Christen Clifford, however they announced their separation in summer of 2021. Wark is a trans woman.

Works
In Virtual Geography, published in 1994, Wark offers a theory of what she calls the 'weird global media event'. Examples given in the book include the stock market crash of 1987, the Tiananmen square demonstrations of 1989 and the fall of the Berlin Wall in 1989. She argues that the emergence of a global media space – a virtual geography – made out of increasingly pervasive lines of communication – vectors – was emerging as a more chaotic space than globalisation theory usually maintains.

Much of Wark's early engagement in public debate occurred in the Australian post-marxist quarterly Arena, through a number of articles and exchanges about the character of real abstraction, the meta-ideological character of post-structuralism, and the consequences of these issues for emancipatory social theory.

In two subsequent books, The Virtual Republic, published in 1997, and Celebrities, Culture and Cyberspace (1999), Wark turned her attention to the national cultural space of her homeland, Australia. The first of these works examines the so-called 'culture wars' of the 1990s as symptomatic of struggles over the redefinition of Australian national identity and culture in an age of global media. The second of these 'Australian' books looked at the transformation of a social democratic idea of the 'popular' as a political idea into a more market-based and media-driven popular culture.

Both these studies grew out of Wark's experience as a public intellectual who participated in public controversies, mainly through her newspaper column in The Australian, a leading national daily. She developed an approach based on participant observation, but adapted to the media sphere.

Wark describes the process of culture by which "the jolt of new experiences becomes naturalised into habit" or second nature and describes the information society as not being new but something that changes through culture the balance between space binding and time binding media.

She further describes the concept of "third nature" or telesthesia, where devices such as television and the telephone create a platform which we use to communicate to people over large distances and not just a machine that we learn to operate individually. This is described in her book The Virtual Republic:
While it may feel natural for some to inhabit this media-made world, I suspect there is a fundamental change here that has a lot of people just a bit spooked. It's no longer a case of making second nature out of nature, of building things and getting used to living in the world people build. I think it might be interesting to consider telesthesia to be something fundamentally different. What gets woven out of telegraph, telephone, television, telecommunications is not a second nature but what I call third nature.

Wark emigrated to the United States in 2000. With the Australian poet John Kinsella, Australian novelist Bernard Cohen and Australian memoirist Terri-Ann White, Wark co-wrote Speed Factory, an experimental work about distance and expatriation. The co-authors developed for this the speed factory writing technique, in which an author writes 300 words, emails it to the next author, who then has 24 hours to write the next 300 words.

Dispositions, another experimental work, followed. Wark travelled the world with a GPS device and recorded observations at particular times and coordinates. The media theorist Ned Rossiter has called this approach a 'micro-empiricism', and sees it as derived from the work of the philosopher Gilles Deleuze.

In 2004 Wark published her best known work, A Hacker Manifesto. Here Wark argues that the rise of intellectual property creates a new class division, between those who produce it, whom she calls the hacker class, and those who come to own it, the vectoralist class. Wark argues that these vectoralists have imposed the concept of property on all physical fields (thus having scarcity), but now the new vectoralists lay claim to intellectual property, a field that is not bound by scarcity. By the concept of intellectual property these vectoralists attempt to institute an imposed scarcity in an immaterial field. Wark argues that the vectoral class cannot control the intellectual (property) world itself, but only in its commodified form—not its overall application or use.

Gamer Theory combines Wark's interest in experimental writing techniques in networked media with her own developing media theory. Gamer Theory was first published by the Institute for the Future of the Book as a networked book with her own specially designed interface. In Gamer Theory Wark argues that in a world that is increasingly competitive and game-like, computer games are a utopian version of the world (itself an imperfect game), because they actually realise the principles of the level playing field and reward based on merit that is elsewhere promised but not actually delivered.

Wark's recent work explores the art, writing, and politics of the Situationist International (SI). In her book 50 Years of Recuperation of the Situationist International (the result of a lecture given at Columbia University), Wark examines the influences of Situationist aesthetics on contemporary art and activist movements, from tactical media to the anti-globalism movement. Wark pays particular attention to often-neglected figures and works in the SI, including the utopian architectural projects of Constant, the painting of Giuseppe Pinot, The Situationist Times of Jacqueline de Jong and the novels of Michèle Bernstein.

In 2013 Wark, along with Alexander Galloway and Eugene Thacker, published the book Excommunication: Three Inquiries in Media and Mediation. In the opening of the book the authors ask "Does everything that exists, exist to be presented and represented, to be mediated and remediated, to be communicated and translated? There are mediative situations in which heresy, exile, or banishment carry the day, not repetition, communion, or integration. There are certain kinds of messages that state 'there will be no more messages'. Hence for every communication there is a correlative excommunication." This approach has been referred to as the "New York School of Media Theory."

At The New School, Professor Wark teaches seminars on the Situationist International, the Militarized Vision lecture, as well as Introduction to Cultural Studies. Wark was an Eyebeam resident in 2007.

In 2019, McKenzie Wark's book Capital Is Dead: Is This Something Worse? was published from Verso. Building on her earlier book A Hacker Manifesto, Wark differentiates vectoralist class from capitalists and landlords as a new ruling class gaining its power through the ownership and control of information.

Reception
At the theoretical level, Wark's writing can be seen in the context of three currents: British Cultural Studies, German Critical Theory and French Poststructuralism. Her earlier works combined British and French influences to extend Australian cultural studies to encompass questions of globalisation and new media technology. Her later works draw more from Critical Theory and much revised Marxism. Through her experimentation with new media forms, starting with listservers such as nettime.org and later with web interfaces such as the one developed for Gamer Theory, her works intersect with other new media theorists such as Geert Lovink and Mark Amerika.

Bibliography
 Virtual Geography: Living With Global Media Events (Indiana University Press, 1994)
 The Virtual Republic: Australia’s Culture wars of the 1990s (Allen & Unwin, 1997)
 Ray Edgar and Ashley Crawford (eds) Transit Lounge (Fine Art Publishing, 1998 – includes several of Wark's 21C essays).
 Celebrities, Culture and Cyberspace (Pluto Press Australia, 1999)
 Josephine Bosma et al. (eds), Readme! (Autonomedia, 1999)
 Dispositions (Salt Publishing, 2002)
 Speed Factory, with Bernard Cohen, John Kinsella and Terri-Ann White (Fremantle Arts Centre Press, 2002)
 A Hacker Manifesto (Harvard University Press, 2004; Spanish translation: Un Manifiesto Hacker, Alpha Decay, Barcelona, 2006)
 GAM3R 7H30RY (Institute for the Future of the Book, 2006 – Link)
 Gamer Theory (Harvard University Press, 2007)
 50 Years of Recuperation of the Situationist International (Princeton Architectural Press, 2008)
 The Beach Beneath the Street: The Everyday Life and Glorious Times of the Situationist International (Verso, 2011)
 Telesthesia: Communication, Culture and Class (Polity, 2012)
Excommunication: Three Inquiries in Media and Mediation (with Alexander R. Galloway and Eugene Thacker) (University of Chicago Press, 2013)
 The Spectacle of Disintegration (Verso, 2013)
 Molecular Red: Theory for the Anthropocene (Verso, 2015)
 General Intellects: Twenty-One Thinkers for the Twenty-First Century (Verso, 2017)
 Capital Is Dead: Is This Something Worse? (Verso, 2019)
 Reverse Cowgirl (Semiotext(e), 2020)
Sensoria: Thinkers for the Twenty-first Century (Verso, 2020)
Philosophy for Spiders: On the Low Theory of Kathy Acker (Duke University Press, 2021)

See also
 Situationist International
 Guy Debord
 Raoul Vaneigem
 Constant Nieuwenhuys
 Jacqueline de Jong
 Michèle Bernstein
 Alexander R. Galloway
 Jussi Parikka
 Eugene Thacker
 Hacktivism
 Marshall McLuhan

References

External links
 The New School: McKenzie Wark
 A Hacker Manifesto
 Hacker Manifesto, version 4
 From Hypertext to Codework, Hypermedia Joyce Studies 3.1 (2002)
 Interview with First Monday
 Review of A Hacker Manifesto by Terry Eagleton
 Post Human? All Too Human
 Chronicle of Higher Education article Gamer Theory and the networked book
 GAMER THE0RY, version 2.0 (Institute for the Future of the Book)
 The Aims of Education (The New School convocation, 2 September 2010)
 An Inhuman Fiction of Forces, lecture at Leper Creativity symposium, The New School, 11 March 2011
 The Legacy of Marshall McLuhan, ABC Radio, 15 July 2011
 The Unreturnable Situationist International – Berfrois Interviews McKenzie Wark, 2 September 2011
 Courting Vectoralists – An Interview with McKenzie Wark on the 10-Year Anniversary of A Hacker Manifesto, LA Review of Books, 17 December 2013
 New Ancestors – A Conversation with McKenzie Wark and Gean Moreno, e-flux No. 51 (2014)
 Excommunication – Mediating the Nonhuman, with Alexander Galloway and Eugene Thacker, NYU, 16 April 2014
 New knowledge for a new planet: critical pedagogy for the Anthropocene, interview with Petar Jandrić, Open Review of Educational Research, 3(1), 148–178.

1961 births
Living people
Australian academics
Australian women philosophers
Australian philosophers
The New School faculty
Philosophers of technology
Transgender women
Transgender writers
Australian LGBT writers
Transgender academics